The 1991–92 1. FC Köln season was the 43rd season in the club's history and the 29th consecutive season playing in the Bundesliga. Köln finished fourth in the league.

The club also participated in the DFB-Pokal where it reached the third round, losing 0–2 to Bayer Leverkusen.

Competitions

Overview

Bundesliga

DFB Pokal

Statistics

Squad statistics

|}

References

Köln
1. FC Köln seasons